Stuart Kevin Parker (born 13 April 1963) is an English former professional footballer who played as a goalkeeper. He made appearances in the English Football League with Wrexham in the 1980s.

References

1963 births
Living people
English footballers
Association football goalkeepers
Wrexham A.F.C. players
Oswestry Town F.C. players
Brymbo F.C. players
Lex XI F.C. players
English Football League players
People from Nantwich
Mold Alexandra F.C. players
Brymbo F.C. managers